Arne Falk (1886 – 11 November 1973) was a Norwegian journalist and newspaper editor.

He was born in Herøy in the district of Helgeland. Working as a journalist in Den 17de Mai from 1913, Falk edited the newspaper Norsk Tidend from 1937 to 1946 and the magazine Journalisten from 1946 to 1962.

He was awarded the Melsom Prize in 1970. He was an honorary member of both the Oslo Union of Journalists, the Norwegian Union of Journalists and the Norwegian Press Association.

References

1886 births
1973 deaths
People from Helgeland
People from Herøy, Nordland
Norwegian newspaper editors
Norwegian magazine editors
Nynorsk-language writers